Shadow Star, known in Japan as , is a Japanese manga series written and illustrated by Mohiro Kitoh, originally serialized in Kodansha's seinen manga magazine Monthly Afternoon from 1998 to 2003. In North America, it was licensed by Dark Horse Comics and serialized in Super Manga Blast!. A 13-episode anime adaptation by Planet was broadcast in 2003 and was released in English by Central Park Media.

Plot

The protagonist of the series is a twelve-year-old girl named Shiina Tamai. She bonds with a starfish-shaped "dragonchild" (baby "shadow dragon") whom she calls Hoshimaru. The series is mainly about the interaction between Shiina and other young people who have also bonded with dragons.

Media

Manga

Shadow Star, written and illustrated by Mohiro Kitoh, was serialized in Kodansha's seinen manga magazine Monthly Afternoon from 1998 to 2003. Kodansha collected its chapters in twelve tankōbon volumes, released from August 19, 1998, to December 22, 2003.

In North America, the manga was licensed for English release by Dark Horse Comics and serialized in Super Manga Blast!. The series ran in the magazine from March 29, 2000, to February 1, 2006, when the magazine ceased its publication. Dark Horse Comics collected the chapters in seven volumes, which were released from September 5, 2001, to December 21, 2005.

Anime

A 13-episode anime adaptation by Planet was broadcast from July 7, to September 29, 2003, on Kids Station. The anime adapted the storyline of the first six volumes (seven volumes of the American release) of the manga.

The anime was licensed by Central Park Media and released in English as Shadow Star Narutaru, and has played on Comcast's Anime Selects multiple times. In 2007 it ran on the Illusion on Demand television network. Central Park Media released the title under their "U.S. Manga Corps" line, on 4 DVDs, and later re-released the DVDs in a box set. Central Park Media filed for bankruptcy in 2009, and the DVDs have since been out of print.

Reception
Tasha Robinson of the Sci Fi Channel described the anime series as "transformed" from "fascinatingly quirky" to "slow but expressive".

References

External links

 
ANIMEFringe article about Shadow Star

1998 manga
2003 anime television series debuts
Central Park Media
Dark fantasy anime and manga
Dark Horse Comics titles
Kids Station original programming
Kodansha manga
Mystery anime and manga
Seinen manga